In 1984, the International Organization for Succulent Plant Study set up a working party, now called the International Cactaceae Systematics Group, to produce a consensus classification of the cactus family, down to the level of genus. Their classification has been used as the basis for systems published since the mid-1990s. Treatments in the 21st century have generally divided the family into around 125–130 genera and 1,400–1,500 species, which are then arranged in a number of  tribes and subfamilies. However, subsequent molecular phylogenetic studies have shown that a very high proportion of the higher taxa (genera, tribes and subfamilies) are not monophyletic, i.e. they do not contain all of the descendants of a common ancestor. , the internal classification of the family Cactaceae remained uncertain and subject to change. A classification incorporating many of the insights from the molecular studies was produced by Nyffeler and Eggli in 2010.

Overview

The classification of the family Cactaceae remains uncertain . Since the mid-1990s, the system produced by the International Cactaceae Systematics Group (ICSG) of the International Organization for Succulent Plant Study has been used as the basis of many published classifications. Detailed treatments produced in the 21st century have divided the family into around 125–130 genera and 1,400–1,500 species, which are then arranged into a number of tribes and subfamilies.

The ICSG classification of the family recognizes four subfamilies: Pereskioideae (consisting only of the genus Pereskia), Opuntioideae, Maihuenioideae (consisting only of the genus Maihuenia) and Cactoideae. Molecular phylogenetic studies suggest that Pereskia is not monophyletic (i.e. its species are not the complete set of descendants of a common ancestor), so that Pereskioideae is not monophyletic although the three other subfamilies are. The Bayesian consensus cladogram from a 2005 study is shown below:

Five tribes have been recognized within the subfamily Opuntioideae: Tephrocacteae, Pterocacteae, Austrocylindropuntieae, Cylindropuntieae and Opuntieae. All but the first, Tephrocacteae, were shown to be "essentially monophyletic" in molecular phylogenetic study in 2009. A summary of the consensus Bayesian tree is shown below (tribes are bold; the number of species in the study is shown in parentheses).

Many of the genera within the Opuntioideae are not monophyletic. Maihueniopsis is highly polyphyletic, appearing in four separate lineages. The two largest genera within the subfamily, Opuntia and Cylindropuntia are also not monophyletic. The classification of the Opuntioideae is thus uncertain ; Griffith and Porter say that changes in classification will require "broad information (of multiple data types) regarding all species of opuntioid cacti".

The ICSG classification divides the subfamily Cactoideae into nine tribes. However, phylogenetic research has not supported most of these tribes, nor even the genera of which they are composed. A 2011 study found that "an extraordinarily high proportion of genera" were not monophyletic, including 22 (61%) of the 36 genera in the subfamily Cactoideae sampled in the research. Of the nine tribes recognized within Cactoideae, one, Calymmantheae, comprises a single genus, Calymmanthium. Of the remaining eight, only two (Cacteae and Rhipsalideae) have been shown to be monophyletic. A summary of the cladograms for the Cactoideae presented in a 2011 paper is shown below (ICSG tribes in bold).

The classification of the Cactaceae thus remains subject to change, from the genus level upwards. In 2016, David Hunt wrote that "the advent of molecular systematic studies in the past two decades will hopefully have a stabilizing effect on classification in due course, but has so far had the opposite effect".

Nyffler and Eggli (2010) classification
In 2010, Nyffler and Eggli produced a classification based on an explicit phylogeny. The broad outlines of their cladogram agree with that of Hern et al. (2011), shown above, although some details are different. Their classification corresponds to the cladogram shown below.

The table below shows how the genera recognized by Nyffler and Eggli are placed into their subfamilies and tribes (they also use some subtribes, not shown here). The column headed "Older tribe (if different)" shows the ICSG classification of the subfamily Cactoideae (as presented by Anderson in 2001) with a 2002 classification of the subfamily Opuntioideae. There are differences in the genera recognized in the systems; where the older system does not recognize the genus, "–" is shown.

Earlier classification

Unless otherwise indicated, the subfamily placement of the genera listed here is based on Anderson's 2001 presentation of the ICSG classification, as is the tribal placement of the genera of the subfamily Cactoideae. The division of the subfamily Opuntioideae into tribes is additional to the ICSG system.

Subfamily Pereskioideae

Pereskia Mill.
synonyms: Peirescia Zucc. (orth. var.), Peireskia Steud. (orth. var.), Perescia Lem. (orth. var.), Rhodocactus (A.Berger) F.M.Knuth

Subfamily Opuntioideae

Tribe Austrocylindropuntieae
Austrocylindropuntia Backeb.
Cumulopuntia F.Ritter

Tribe Cylindropuntieae

Cylindropuntia (Engelm.) F.M.Knuth – chollas
Grusonia F.Rchb. ex Britton & Rose
including Corynopuntia F.M.Knuth, Micropuntia Daston

Pereskiopsis Britton & Rose
synonyms: Peireskiopsis Vaupel (orth. var.)

Quiabentia Britton & Rose

Tribe Opuntieae

Brasiliopuntia (K.Schum.) A.Berger
Consolea Lem.
Miqueliopuntia Fric ex F.Ritter
Opuntia Mill. – prickly pears
synonyms: Airampoa Fric, Cactodendron Bigelow, nom. inval., Cactus Lem., Chaffeyopuntia Fric & Schelle, Clavarioidia Kreuz. (nom. inval.), Ficindica St.-Lag., Nopalea Salm-Dyck, Parviopuntia Soulaire & Marn.-Lap. (nom. inval.), Phyllarthus Neck. ex M.Gómez (nom. inval.), Salmiopuntia Fric (nom. inval.), Subulatopuntia Fric & Schelle, Tunas Lunell, Weberiopuntia Fric
including Nopalea Salm-Dyck
Salmonopuntia P.V.Heath
Tacinga Britton & Rose
Tunilla D.R.Hunt & Iliff

Tribe Pterocacteae
Pterocactus K.Schum.

Tribe Tephrocacteae
Maihueniopsis Speg.
including Puna R.Kiesling

Tephrocactus Lem.
synonyms: Pseudotephrocactus Fric

Subfamily Maihuenioideae

Maihuenia (Phil. ex F.A.C.Weber) K.Schum.

Subfamily Cactoideae

Tribe Browningieae
Armatocereus Backeb.
Browningia Cárdenas, Gymnocereus Rauh & Backeb.
Jasminocereus Britton & Rose
Neoraimondia Britton & Rose
synonyms: Neocardenasia Backeb.

Stetsonia Britton & Rose

Tribe Cacteae
Acharagma (N.P.Taylor) Glass
AriocarpusScheidw. – living rock
synonyms: Anhalonium Lem., Neogomesia Castañeda, Neogomezia Buxb. (orth. var.), Roseocactus A.Berger, Stromatocactus Karw. ex Rümpler (nom. inval.)Astrophytum Lem.
synonyms: Astrophyton Lawr. (orth. var.), Maierocactus E.C.RostAztekium Boed.
 Cochemiea (K.Brandegee) Walton – see MammillariaCoryphantha (Engelm.) Lem. – beehive cactus
synonyms: Aulacothele Monv. (nom. inval.), Cumarinia Buxb., Glandulifera (Salm-Dyck) Fric, Lepidocoryphantha Backeb., Roseia Fric (nom. inval.)Echinocactus Link & Otto – barrel cactus
synonyms: Brittonrosea Speg., Echinofossulocactus Lawr., Homalocephala Britton & RoseEchinomastus Britton & RoseEpithelantha F.A.C.Weber ex Britton & Rose – pingpong ball cactusEscobaria Britton & Rose – foxtail cactus, pincushion cactus
synonyms: Cochiseia W.H.Earle, Escobesseya Hester, Fobea Fric (nom. inval.), Neobesseya Britton & RoseFerocactus Britton & Rose – barrel cactus
synonyms: Bisnaga Orcutt, Brittonia C.A.Armstr. (nom. inval.)Geohintonia Glass & W.A.Fitz Maur.Leuchtenbergia Hook.Lophophora J.M.Coult. – peyoteMammillaria Haw. – fishhook cactus, globe cactus, pincushion cactus, bird's-nest cactus 
synonyms: Bartschella Britton & Rose, Cactus L., Chilita Orcutt, Cochemiea (K.Brandegee) Walton, Dolichothele (K.Schum.) Britton & Rose, Ebnerella Buxb., Haagea Fric, Krainzia Backeb., Lactomammillaria Fric (nom. inval.), Leptocladia Buxb., Leptocladodia Buxb., Mamillaria F.Rchb. (orth. var.), Mamillopsis (E.Morren) F.A.C.Weber ex Britton & Rose, Mammariella Shafer (nom. inval.), Mammilaria Torr. & A.Gray (orth. var.), Neomammillaria Britton & Rose, Oehmea Buxb., Phellosperma Britton & Rose, Porfiria Boed., Pseudomammillaria Buxb., Solisia Britton & RoseMammilloydia Buxb.Neolloydia Britton & Rose
synonyms: Napina Fric (nom. inval.), Pseudosolisia Y.Itô (nom. inval.)Obregonia FricOrtegocactus AlexanderPediocactus Britton & Rose – hedgehog cactus
synonyms: Navajoa Croizat, Pilocanthus B.W.Benson & Backeb.Pelecyphora C.Ehrenb.
synonyms: Encephalocarpus A.BergerSclerocactus Britton & Rose – fishhook cactus
synonyms: Ancistrocactus Britton & Rose, Coloradoa Boissev. & C.Davidson, Glandulicactus Backeb., Toumeya Britton & RoseStenocactus (K.Schum.) A.W.Hill
synonyms: Echinofossulocactus Britton & Rose, Efossus Orcutt (orth. var.)Strombocactus Britton & RoseThelocactus (K.Schum.) Britton & Rose
synonyms: Hamatocactus Britton & Rose, Thelomastus Fric (nom. inval.)Turbinicarpus (Backeb.) Buxb. & Backeb. – top cactus
synonyms: Gymnocactus Backeb., Normanbokea Kladiwa & Buxb., Rapicactus Buxb. & Oehme

Tribe CalymmantheaeCalymmanthium F.Ritter
synonyms: Diploperianthium F.Ritter (nom. inval.)

Tribe CereeaeAylostera 
synonyms: Digitorebutia Frič & Kreuz. ex Buining, Mediolobivia Backeb.Arrojadoa Britton & Rose
synonyms: Pierrebraunia EstevesBrasilicereus Backeb.Cereus Mill. – sweet potato cactus
synonyms: Mirabella F.Ritter, Piptanthocereus (A.Berger) Riccob., Subpilocereus Backeb.Cipocereus F.Ritter
synonyms: Floribunda F.RitterColeocephalocereus Backeb.
synonyms: Buiningia Buxb.Melocactus Link & Otto
synonyms: Cactus Britton & RoseMicranthocereus Backeb.
synonyms: Austrocephalocereus Backeb., Siccobaccatus P.J.Braun & EstevesPilosocereus Byles & G. D. Rowley – tree cactus
synonyms: Pilocereus K.Schum., Pseudopilocereus Buxb.Praecereus Buxb.Reicheocactus Backeb.Stephanocereus A.BergerUebelmannia Buining

Tribe HylocereeaeDisocactus Lindl.
synonyms: Aporocactus Lem., Aporocereus Fric & Kreuz. (orth. var.), Bonifazia Standl. & Steyerm., Chiapasia Britton & Rose, Disisocactus Kunze (orth. var.), Disocereus Fric & Kreuz. (orth. var.), Heliocereus (A.Berger) Britton & Rose, Lobeira Alexander, Mediocereus Fric & Kreuz. (orth. var.), Nopalxochia Britton & Rose, Pseudonopalxochia Backeb., Trochilocactus Linding., Wittia K.Schum., Wittiocactus RauschertEpiphyllum Haw. – climbing cactus
synonyms: Phyllocactus Link, Phyllocereus Miq.Hylocereus (A.Berger) Britton & Rose – nightblooming cactus
synonyms: Wilmattea Britton & RosePseudorhipsalis Britton & RoseSelenicereus (A.Berger) Britton & Rose – moonlight cactus, nightblooming cereus
synonyms: Cryptocereus Alexander, Deamia Britton & Rose, Marniera Backeb., Mediocactus Britton & Rose, Strophocactus Britton & Rose, Strophocereus Fric & Kreuz. (orth. var.)Weberocereus Britton & Rose
synonyms: Eccremocactus Britton & Rose, Eccremocereus Fric & Kreuz. (orth. var.), Werckleocereus Britton & Rose

Tribe NotocacteaeAustrocactus Britton & RoseBlossfeldia Werderm.Cintia Knize & RíhaCopiapoa Britton & Rose
synonyms: Pilocopiapoa F.RitterEriosyce Phil.
synonyms: Ceratistes Labour. (nom. inval.), Chileniopsis Backeb., Chileocactus Fric (nom. inval.), Chileorebutia Fric (nom. inval.), Chiliorebutia Fric (orth. var.), Delaetia Backeb., Dracocactus Y.Itô (nom. inval.), Euporteria Kreuz. & Buining, Hildmannia Kreuz. & Buining, Horridocactus Backeb., Islaya Backeb., Neochilenia Backeb. ex Dölz, Neoporteria Britton & Rose, Neoporteria Backeb., Neotanahashia Y.Itô, Nichelia Bullock (nom. inval.), Pyrrhocactus (A.Berger) A.W.Hill, Rodentiophila F.Ritter ex Backeb., Thelocephala Y.ItôEulychnia Phil.
synonyms: Philippicereus Backeb.Frailea Britton & RoseNeowerdermannia FricParodia Speg.
synonyms: Acanthocephala Backeb., Brasilicactus Backeb., Brasiliparodia F.Ritter, Brasilocactus Fric (nom. inval.), Chrysocactus Y.Itô (nom. inval.), Dactylanthocactus Y.Itô, Eriocactus Backeb., Eriocephala Backeb., Friesia Fric (nom. inval.), Hickenia Britton & Rose, Malacocarpus Salm-Dyck, Microspermia Fric, Neohickenia Fric, Notocactus (K.Schum.) Fric, Sericocactus Y.Itô, Wigginsia D.M.PorterYavia R.Kiesling & Piltz 

Tribe PachycereeaeAcanthocereus (Engelm. ex A.Berger) Britton & Rose – triangle cactus
synonyms: Dendrocereus Britton & Rose, Monvillea Britton & RoseBergerocactus Britton & Rose – snake cactus
synonyms: Bergerocereus Fric & Kreuz. (orth. var.)Carnegiea Britton & Rose – saguaroCephalocereus Pfeiff. – old man cactus
synonyms: Haseltonia Backeb., Neodawsonia Backeb., Pilocereus Lem.Corryocactus Britton & Rose
synonym: Corryocereus Fric & Kreuz. (orth. var.), Erdisia Britton & Rose, Eulychnocactus Backeb. (nom. inval.)

 Dendrocereus Britton & Rose – see AcanthocereusEchinocereus Engelm. – hedgehog cactus
synonyms: Morangaya G.D.Rowley, Wilcoxia Britton & RoseEscontria Rose
 Isolatocereus Backeb. – see StenocereusLeptocereus (A.Berger) Britton & Rose
synonyms: Neoabbottia Britton & Rose

×Myrtgerocactus Moran 
[= Myrtillocactus × Bergerocactus]Myrtillocactus Console
synonyms: Myrtillocereus Fric & Kreuz. (orth. var.)Neobuxbaumia Backeb.
synonyms: Pseudomitrocereus Bravo & Buxb., Rooksbya Backeb.

×Pacherocactus G.D.Rowley
[= Pachycereus × Bergerocactus]Pachycereus (A.Berger) Britton & Rose
synonyms: Backebergia Bravo, Lemaireocereus Britton & Rose, Lophocereus (A.Berger) Britton & Rose, Marginatocereus (Backeb.) Backeb., Mitrocereus (Backeb.) Backeb., Pterocereus T.MacDoug. & MirandaPeniocereus (A.Berger) Britton & Rose
synonyms: Cullmannia Distefano, Neoevansia W.T.Marshall, Nyctocereus (A.Berger) Britton & RosePolaskia Backeb.
synonyms: Chichipia Backeb. (nom. inval.), Heliabravoa Backeb.Pseudoacanthocereus F.RitterStenocereus (A.Berger) Riccob.
synonyms: Hertrichocereus Backeb., Isolatocereus Backeb., Isolatocereus (Backeb.) Backeb., Machaerocereus Britton & Rose, Marshallocereus Backeb., Neolemaireocereus Backeb., Rathbunia Britton & Rose, Ritterocereus Backeb.

Tribe RhipsalideaeHatiora Britton & Rose
synonyms: Epiphyllopsis Backeb. & F.M.Knuth, Hariota DC., Pseudozygocactus Backeb., Rhipsalidopsis Britton & RoseLepismium Pfeiff.
synonyms: Acanthorhipsalis (K.Schum.) Britton & Rose, Acanthorhipsalis Kimnach, Pfeiffera Salm-DyckRhipsalis Gaertn.
synonyms: Cassytha Mill., Erythrorhipsalis A.Berger, Hariota Adans., Lymanbensonia KimnachSchlumbergera Lem. – Christmas cactus, Easter cactus
synonyms: Epiphyllanthus A.Berger, Epiphyllum Pfeiff., Opuntiopsis Knebel (nom. inval.), Zygocactus K.Schum., Zygocereus Fric & Kreuz. (orth. var.)

Tribe TrichocereeaeAcanthocalycium Backeb.
synonyms: Spinicalycium Fric (nom. inval.)Arthrocereus A.BergerBrachycereus Britton & RoseCleistocactus Lem.
synonyms: Akersia Buining, Bolivicereus Cárdenas, Borzicactella H.Johnson ex F.Ritter, Borzicactus Riccob, Borzicereus Fric & Kreuz. (orth. var.), Cephalocleistocactus F.Ritter, Cleistocereus Fric & Kreuz. (orth. var.), Clistanthocereus Backeb., Demnosa Fric, Gymnanthocereus Backeb., Hildewintera F.Ritter, Loxanthocereus Backeb., Maritimocereus Akers, Pseudoechinocereus Buining (nom. inval.), Seticereus Backeb., Seticleistocactus Backeb., Winteria F.Ritter, Winterocereus Backeb.

 Cephalocleistocactus F.Ritter – see CleistocactusDenmoza Britton & RoseDiscocactus Pfeiff.Echinopsis Zucc. – San Pedro cactus
synonyms: Acantholobivia Backeb., Acanthopetalus Y.Itô, Andenea Fric (nom. inval.), Aureilobivia Fric, nom. inval., Chamaecereus Britton & Rose, Chamaelobivia Y. Itô (nom. inval.), Cinnabarinea Fric ex F.Ritter, Echinolobivia Y.Itô (nom. inval.), Echinonyctanthus Lem., Furiolobivia Y.Itô (nom. inval.), Helianthocereus Backeb, Heterolobivia Y.Itô (nom. inval.), Hymenorebulobivia Fric (nom. inval.), Hymenorebutia Fric ex Buining, Leucostele Backeb., Lobirebutia Fric (nom. inval.), Lobivia Britton & Rose, Lobiviopsis Fric (nom. inval.), Megalobivia Y.Itô (nom. inval.), Mesechinopsis Y.Itô, Neolobivia Y.Itô, Pilopsis Y.Itô (nom. inval.), Pseudolobivia (Backeb.) Backeb., Rebulobivia Fric (nom. inval.), Salpingolobivia Y.Itô, Scoparebutia Fric & Kreuz. ex Buining, Setiechinopsis (Backeb.) de Haas, Soehrensia Backeb., Trichocereus (A.Berger) Riccob.Espostoa Britton & Rose
synonyms: Binghamia Britton & Rose, Pseudoespostoa Backeb., Thrixanthocereus Backeb., Espostoopsis Buxb.
synonyms: Gerocephalus F.RitterFacheiroa Britton & Rose
synonyms: Zehntnerella Britton & RoseGymnocalycium Pfeiff. ex Mittler – chin cactus
synonyms: Brachycalycium Backeb.Haageocereus Backeb.
synonyms: Floresia Krainz & F.Ritter ex Backeb. (nom. inval.), Haageocactus Backeb. (nom. inval.), Lasiocereus F.Ritter, Neobinghamia Backeb., Peruvocereus Akers

× Haagespostoa G.D.Rowley
[= Haageocereus × Espostoa]Harrisia Britton – apple cactus
synonyms: Eriocereus (A.Berger) Riccob., Roseocereus Backeb.

 Lasiocereus F.Ritter – see HaageocereusLeocereus Britton & RoseMatucana Britton & Rose
synonyms: Eomatucana F.RitterMila Britton & RoseOreocereus (A.Berger) Riccob.
synonyms: Arequipa Britton & Rose, Arequipiopsis Kreuz. & Buining, Morawetzia Backeb., Submatucana Backeb.Oroya Britton & RosePygmaeocereus H.Johnson & Backeb.Rauhocereus Backeb.Rebutia K.Schum.
synonyms: Aylostera Speg., Bridgesia Backeb., Cylindrorebutia Fric & Kreuz., Digitorebutia Fric & Kreuz., Echinorebutia Fric (nom. inval.), Eurebutia Fric (nom. inval.), Gymnantha Y.Itô, Mediolobivia Backeb., Mediorebutia Fric (nom. inval.), Neogymnantha Y.Itô, Reicheocactus Backeb., Setirebutia Fric & Kreuz. (nom. inval.), Spegazzinia Backeb., Sulcorebutia Backeb., Weingartia Werderm.Samaipaticereus CárdenasWeberbauerocereus Backeb.
synonyms: Meyenia Backeb.Vatricania Backeb.Yungasocereus'' F.Ritter

Notes and references

Bibliography
 

 
Cactaceae